Playboy After Dark is an American television show hosted by Hugh Hefner. It aired in syndication through Screen Gems from 1969 to 1970 and was taped at CBS Television City in Los Angeles.

Overview

Playboy After Dark followed much the same style as Hefner's earlier show, Playboy's Penthouse (1959–1960), which had been taped at WBKB-TV in Chicago. The show portrayed a "typical" party at Hefner's place, complete with Playboy Playmates and celebrities, who then chatted with Hefner and performed for the party. Guests included Barbi Benton, Joe Cocker, Ike & Tina Turner, Sammy Davis Jr., Jerry Lewis, Peter Lawford, Buddy Rich, The Byrds, The Cowsills, Sir Douglas Quintet, Sweetwater, Harry Nilsson, Grateful Dead, Moms Mabley, Cher, Deep Purple, Fleetwood Mac, Three Dog Night, Steppenwolf, Canned Heat, Grand Funk Railroad, James Brown, Iron Butterfly, Linda Ronstadt, Jack Jones, Don Rickles, and others.

The first episode features Sally Marr, mother of Lenny Bruce, who had appeared on Playboy's Penthouse ten years earlier.

DVD release
Two volumes of the best of Playboy After Dark have been released on DVD.

References

External links
 
 

Television series by Playboy Enterprises
1969 American television series debuts
1970 American television series endings
Television series by Sony Pictures Television
Television shows based on magazines
1960s American variety television series
1970s American variety television series
English-language television shows
Playboy TV original programming
First-run syndicated television programs in the United States
Television series by Screen Gems